Albert Sylvain Charles Lucas (4 February 1899 – 27 January 1967) was a French hurdler. He competed in the 400 m event at the 1920 Summer Olympics, but failed to reach the final.

References

1899 births
1967 deaths
French male hurdlers
Athletes (track and field) at the 1920 Summer Olympics
Olympic athletes of France
19th-century French people
20th-century French people